"Letting Go (Dutty Love)" is a song by American recording artist Sean Kingston. It was produced by Stargate, and features rapper Nicki Minaj. The song was originally released as the second single from Kingston's third studio album, Back 2 Life, but was taken off for unknown reasons. As of December 2014, the song has sold 1.1 million copies in the United States.

Background
The song was produced by Stargate and written by Sean Kingston, Ester Dean, Stargate, Traci Hale, and Nicki Minaj who appears on the track. The official remix features rapper Rick Ross. With the release of the song, Kingston commented on how proud he was of his song, calling it his strongest single yet. He stated on Twitter: "Okay, so I never felt so good about ANY of my songs since 'Beautiful Girls' but trust me when I tell YOU... 'Letting Go (Dutty Love)' is a HIT!"

The song was released onto iTunes on June 21, 2010 on "East Coast Digital Radio-Hip-Hop/Rap Podcast/Blog" for a free download as a podcast.

An alternate version of the song exists that appears to be an earlier version of the song. Said version does not feature vocals from Nicki Minaj, which suggests that it was the original version of the song before Minaj had been arranged, and therefore has a different third verse; furthermore the ending is extended and features one more repetition of the last line. The song's length of 3 minutes and 47 seconds is about the same as the regular version (that includes the intro by Minaj from the third verse at the beginning). This alternate version is referred to as Letting Go (Dutty Love) (Promo Only Clean Edit). It is not known if the version was leaked or distributed for promotional use by the record label.

Composition
The song sounds similar to Rihanna's "Te Amo", which was also produced by the same production team, Stargate. The song has been described as an "island-tinged" jam that features synthesized dance floor beats and air horn effects. Minaj is featured in the song during the bridge and an additional verse reigning in her R-rated commentary on the "light-and-fluffy" track. "Letting Go (Dutty Love)" lyrically speaks of about new love, letting go of worries and just having fun. The melody and its backbeat feature the refrain "Dutty, dutty, dutty love love", which has been complimented. Kingston accentuates a Caribbean drawl atop steel drums and a heavy bassline.

Critical reception
Rap-Up gave the song a positive review stating "Sound the alarm. Sean Kingston has just entered the race for the song of the summer." Erika Brooks Adickman of Idolator commented "All in all, we want to slap on some roller-skates and bop our heads to this song on our iPods. Can we place 'Letting Go (Dutty Love)' in the race as Song for the Summer?" On December 2, 2011, the song was certified platinum by the RIAA.

Music video
A music video for the single was shot over the weekend of June 17, 2010, in Jamaica, directed by Lil X. Pictures of Kingston and Minaj on the set of the music video leaked onto the internet June 21, 2010, A sneak peek of the music video was released on Rap-Up on July 29  The music video premiered on Twitter on August 3, 2010. The video takes place in a dance-hall in Jamaica with a cast of dancers and fire-breathers, including American-Jamaican artist Shaggy. Throughout the video, Kingston and Minaj are seen singing into the camera while dancing on the dance-floor and singing their verses on a stage into an old fashioned microphone. The video ends with Minaj blowing a kiss into the camera.

Live performances
Minaj has rapped her verse on select dates of her Pink Friday Tour. She also performed her part on her Pink Friday: Reloaded Tour.

Charts and certifications

Weekly charts

Certifications

Release history

References

2010 singles
Music videos directed by Director X
Nicki Minaj songs
Sean Kingston songs
Songs written by Nicki Minaj
Songs written by Tor Erik Hermansen
Songs written by Mikkel Storleer Eriksen
Songs written by Ester Dean
Song recordings produced by Stargate (record producers)
Songs written by Traci Hale
Songs written by Sean Kingston
Reggae fusion songs
2010 songs